Odontoscelia is a genus of cactus flies in the family Neriidae.

Species
Odontoscelia flavipes (Wiedemann, 1830)
Odontoscelia marginella (Rondani, 1848)

References

Brachycera genera
Neriidae
Taxa named by Günther Enderlein
Diptera of South America